Acupalpus alluaudianus is an insect-eating beetle of the genus Acupalpus.

References

alluaudianus
Beetles described in 1998